Tha'alibi is an Arabic surname. Notable people with the surname include:
 Abu Mansour al-Hosein ibn Muhammad al-Marghani, Persian-born Islamic historian
 Abdelaziz Thâalbi (1876–1944), Tunisian politician
 Sidi Abder Rahman El Thaelebi (1384–1479), Islamic scholar
 Ahmad ibn Muhammad al-Tha'labi (died 1030s), Islamic scholar

See also
 Tha'alibi or Abu Mansur 'Abd ul-Malik ibn Muhammad ibn Isma'il Neyshapuri, Persian-born Arabic philologist
 Thaalibia (disambiguation)